Stacy Brooks (born April 8, 1952) is a former senior executive of the Church of Scientology International (CSI) and the Sea Organization based in the United States. For over 20 years, Brooks was also a member of the Church, working in its upper level management in Los Angeles for almost fifteen years. 
After leaving in 1989 Brooks joined the Lisa McPherson Trust, served as an expert witness in many high-profile Scientology lawsuits, and has made many television appearances criticizing Scientology, on programs including Dateline, 20/20 and 60 Minutes.

References

Scientology foe sets up office close to church  St. Petersburg Times, published January 6, 2000
 Scientology critics to get bricks St. Petersburg Times, published April 26, 2001

Scientology litigation transcripts of Affidavits and Declarations
Testimony in Injunction Trial transcripts - February 2001

External links
Media Vault of Dateline and 20/20 shows

Critics of Scientology
Living people
1952 births
Former Scientologists